Carlos Julio Arosemena Monroy (24 August 1919 – 5 March 2004) was an Ecuadorian politician. Arosemena Monroy was elected as Vice President of Ecuador in 1960 and due to the ousting of President José María Velasco Ibarra, became President of Ecuador from 7 November 1961 to 11 July 1963.

Biography
He was born in Guayaquil to Carlos Julio Arosemena Tola, a former president of Ecuador, and Laura Monroy Garaycoa. He was President of the Chamber of Deputies in 1952. As Vice President, he was also President of the Senate.

He exercises his mandate in a tumultuous regional context, caused by the Cuban revolution and the establishment of anti-communist military dictatorships in Latin America. During his presidency, he modernized the telecommunications network, created the national aviation company TAME and the Secular and Catholic University of Guayaquil, launched road construction work in the country and introduced the thirteenth month's salary. His support of Fidel Castro's revolution in Cuba caused an ongoing conflict with Congress and the military.

While in office, there were two failed attempts to impeach him. He was overthrown by the Military Junta of 1963 after criticizing the US government and insulting Maurice M. Bernbaum, the US ambassador to Ecuador.

References

External links

1919 births
2004 deaths
People from Guayaquil
Ecuadorian people of Basque descent
Ecuadorian people of Spanish descent
Presidents of Ecuador
Vice presidents of Ecuador
Presidents of the Senate of Ecuador
Presidents of the Chamber of Deputies of Ecuador
Leaders who took power by coup
Leaders ousted by a coup
Children of national leaders